Altaf Ahmad Wani, also known as Altaf Kuloo, (born 1972) is an Indian politician who is a member of the Jammu and Kashmir Legislative Assembly representing the constituency of Pahalgam.

He is the only son of Ghulam Rasool Wani, Engineer-turned-politician, was known to people more as a businessman who had an instinct for educational development and started his career by opening a private school in South Kashmir, Delhi Public School, Anantnag. He started political career in 2008 and unsuccessfully contested his first assembly elections on the Jammu & Kashmir National Conference ticket in the same year. He was later nominated as the Member of Legislative Council in 2009.

Born in an upper-middle class business family in Aishmuqam area of Islamabad, he saw a meteoric rise within the JKNC party in rather a short span of time. Top JKNC sources said Kuloo is in the good books of the party top brass and enjoys the kind of patronage, which other party members with a standing of decades in the party don't have. Kuloo was elected to the Jammu and Kashmir Legislative Assembly constituency of Pahalgam in 2014.

References 

Jammu & Kashmir National Conference politicians
Living people
1974 births
Indian people of Kashmiri descent
Jammu and Kashmir MLAs 2014–2018
People from Anantnag district
Indian Muslims
Members of the Jammu and Kashmir Legislative Council